Rockstar New England, Inc. (formerly Mad Doc Software, LLC) is an American video game developer and a studio of Rockstar Games based in Andover, Massachusetts. Ian Lane Davis founded the company as Mad Doc Software in November 1999 after working as technical director for Activision. The studio worked with Activision on Star Trek: Armada before leading the development of its sequel, Star Trek: Armada II. From 2002 on, Mad Doc was the principal developer of the Empire Earth series, developing two games and two expansions. While the successful Empire Earth II landed the company publishing contracts with Rockstar Games and Bethesda Softworks, Empire Earth III was a critical and commercial failure and led to an end for the series. Mad Doc developed Star Trek: Legacy for Bethesda Softworks and Bully: Scholarship Edition for Rockstar Games. After the latter was released in March 2008, Rockstar Games' parent company, Take-Two Interactive, bought Mad Doc and made it part of Rockstar Games as Rockstar New England. Under Rockstar Games, the studio worked on a sequel to Bully until its developers were reallocated to projects like Max Payne 3.

History

Early years and Empire Earth (1999–2007) 

Rockstar New England was founded as Mad Doc Software by Ian Lane Davis. A native of Andover, Massachusetts, he first came into contact with video games while enrolled at Andover public schools in the late 1970s and early 1980s. He frequently visited arcades and, while at Doherty Junior High around 1982, Davis received his first computer, an Apple II Plus. Among his favorite games were Ultima, Wizardry, and One on One: Dr. J vs. Larry Bird. He later attended Phillips Academy until 1987, graduated from Dartmouth College with majors in mathematics, English, and computer science in 1991, and obtained a doctorate in artificial intelligence and robotics from Carnegie Mellon University in 1996. Davis landed his first job with the video game company Activision in Santa Monica, California, acting as technical director from 1996 to 1999. During this time, he worked on Dark Reign: The Future of War, Battlezone, Dark Reign: Rise of the Shadowhand, and Civilization: Call to Power.

Davis left Activision to move back to Andover, where he founded Mad Doc in November 1999. One year later, the company moved to neighboring Lawrence. As its first project, Mad Doc aided Activision in completing Star Trek: Armada. It also provided additional programming and art for Activision's Call to Power II and led the development of Star Trek: Armada II with eight employees. When the game was announced in March 2001, Mad Doc mostly comprised former developers from Looking Glass Studios, a defunct studio previously based in nearby Cambridge. Star Trek: Armada II was released in November 2001. Mad Doc further inherited the development of Jane's Attack Squadron from Looking Glass Studios, which had been canceled with that studio's closure. The finished game was released in March 2002.

In May 2002, Sierra Entertainment announced Mad Doc as the developer of Empire Earth: The Art of Conquest, an expansion pack for the 2001 game Empire Earth. While the expansion received mixed reviews when it was released in September 2002, Mad Doc remained the principal developer of the Empire Earth series. Around this time, Mad Doc collaborated with Splash Damage on Wolfenstein: Enemy Territory, developing its single-player component. This portion was scrapped by publisher Activision in February 2003 because its development "did not progress as anticipated". With Gas Powered Games, Mad Doc worked on Dungeon Siege: Legends of Aranna, an expansion pack for 2002's Dungeon Siege. Legends of Aranna was released in November 2003, and Mad Doc published a free bonus pack in September 2004. The studio's Empire Earth II was released in April 2005, followed by the expansion Empire Earth II: The Art of Supremacy in February 2006. The success of the game and its expansion led Mad Doc to publishing contracts with Bethesda Softworks and Rockstar Games. With the former, the studio developed Star Trek: Legacy after Bethesda Softworks had acquired a license for the Star Trek franchise. The game was released in November 2006. Mad Doc then developed another Empire Earth installment, Empire Earth III. Due to a multitude of issues, Empire Earth III became a critical and commercial failure and is considered to have ended the Empire Earth franchise.

Acquisition and projects under Rockstar Games (2007–present) 
Under its contract with Rockstar Games, Mad Doc developed an enhanced version of Bully, which had been developed by Rockstar Games' Rockstar Vancouver studio and released to commercial success for the PlayStation 2 in 2006. Mad Doc remastered the game and added further missions, characters, and items. The version was announced as Bully: Scholarship Edition in July 2007 for the Wii and Xbox 360. By December 2007, Mad Doc and its roughly 100 employees had relocated to a  office in Ballardvale, a village within Andover. Davis stated that the studio would remain in Andover because it was his "favorite place", where he lived with his wife Vicky and was planning to raise his children. Shaun McDermott, while chief financial officer of the studio, regarded the location as an asset because of the wide range of lifestyles that employees could live in nearby communities. In late 2007, Davis was named the Entrepreneur of the Year by the Greater Boston Chamber of Commerce. Around this time, Mad Doc created maps for the multiplayer mode of Turok, developed by Propaganda Games and released in February 2008.

Bully: Scholarship Edition was released in March 2008. The acquisition was announced on April 4, 2008, and Mad Doc became part of Rockstar Games as Rockstar New England. Davis remained with the studio as studio director, alongside Ken Davis. Employees initially reacted positively to the acquisition due to the reputation and size of Rockstar Games. Over time, the former Mad Doc workplace culture faded while crunch increased. Some employees "felt they were expected by other people within the company to prove their dedication to Rockstar through long hours, and that they would be 'harassed' when trying to leave the studio". In June 2009, Rockstar New England laid off approximately 10% of its staff, including several artists and the entire quality assurance (QA) department. According to one insider speaking with Kotaku, Rockstar Games sought to have one dedicated QA studio instead of having QA departments at its other studios. Other employees reported at the time that the severance packages were "fairly generous" and that Rockstar Games was helping some of the affected employees get new jobs. However, one laid-off artist later claimed that he had not received such assistance.

Under Rockstar Games, Rockstar New England commenced several projects. It created a Windows version of Bully: Scholarship Edition, which was released in October 2008, and assisted the development of Grand Theft Auto IV: The Lost and Damned, Grand Theft Auto: The Ballad of Gay Tony, and Red Dead Redemption. The studio also began developing a sequel to Bully while Rockstar Vancouver was allocated to Max Payne 3. Some employees believed the project to be a test for the newly acquired studio to prove it was worth the investment. Roughly 50–70 people, the majority of the studio, were involved with the game at some point. The team envisioned a small open world with high interactivity, such as actions towards non-player characters (NPCs) having long-term consequences and every building being enterable, including by force. For the latter, Rockstar New England developed a detailed glass fragmentation system. A vertical slice of Bully 2 was created and playable. However, in 2010, the studio began re-allocating the game's developers to other projects. It joined Rockstar Vancouver, Rockstar London, and Rockstar Toronto in the development of Max Payne 3, which was released in May 2012. The game re-used the glass fragmentation mechanic previously designed for Bully 2.

In early 2013, Rockstar New England completed its three-month process of moving from Ballardvale to Andover's Dundee Park. The studio worked alongside all other Rockstar Games studios on Red Dead Redemption 2, which was released in October 2018. The mechanic of consequences from NPC interactions that the studio had created for Bully 2 was incorporated into this game.

Games developed

As Mad Doc Software

As Rockstar New England

Canceled 
 Wolfenstein: Enemy Territory (single-player)
 Bully 2

References 

1999 establishments in Massachusetts
2008 mergers and acquisitions
American companies established in 1999
Companies based in Essex County, Massachusetts
Rockstar Games subsidiaries
Software companies based in Massachusetts
Take-Two Interactive divisions and subsidiaries
Video game companies established in 1999
Video game companies of the United States
Video game development companies